Saros cycle series 140 for solar eclipses occurs at the Moon's descending node, repeating every 18 years, 11 days, containing 71 events. All eclipses in this series occurs at the Moon's descending node.

This solar saros is linked to Lunar Saros 133.

Saros 140

Saros 140 

It is a part of Saros cycle 140, repeating every 18 years, 11 days, containing 71 events. The series started with partial solar eclipse on April 16, 1512. It contains total eclipses from July 21, 1656 through November 9, 1836, hybrid eclipses from November 20, 1854 through December 23, 1908, and annular eclipses from January 3, 1927 through December 7, 2485. The series ends at member 71 as a partial eclipse on June 1, 2774. The longest duration of totality was 4 minutes, 10 seconds on August 12, 1692.

Umbral eclipses
Umbral eclipses (annular, total and hybrid) can be further classified as either: 1) Central (two limits), 2) Central (one limit) or 3) Non-Central (one limit). The statistical distribution of these classes in Saros series 140 appears in the following table.

Events

References 
 http://eclipse.gsfc.nasa.gov/SEsaros/SEsaros140.html

External links
Saros cycle 140 - Information and visualization

Solar saros series